Alicia Dawn Straub (born May 17, 1978) is an American politician who is a member of the Kansas Senate from the 33rd District since January 11, 2021. She is a former member of the Kansas House of Representatives representing the 113th district from March 19, 2019, to January 11, 2021 . A resident of Ellinwood, Kansas, she was selected by Republican precinct committee members on March 12, 2019, to succeed former Rep. Greg Lewis (R), who resigned due to health issues.  Senator Straub was formally appointed by Governor Laura Kelly to the seat on March 14 and was sworn-in by Kansas Secretary of State Scott Schwab on March 19. Prior to her election to the House of Representatives, she served as a county commissioner in Barton County, Kansas and was the commission chairman from January to March 2019. She resigned from the county commission from a meeting on March 18, 2019, in order to take her seat in the Kansas Legislature.

During the party convention to succeed Representative Lewis, Senator Straub received 51 votes, with 22 votes going to Doug Keesling, a farmer from Rice County, Kansas and 18 votes going to Donna Hoener-Queal, a retired court services officer from Pratt, Kansas.

Straub defeated Sen. Mary Jo Taylor in the Aug. 4, 2020 Republican primary for the 33rd district of the Kansas Senate.

2021-2022 Kansas Senate Committee Assignments
Vice Chairman of Agriculture and Natural Resources
Education
Local Government
Commerce
Transparency and Ethics
Joint Committee on Special Claims Against the State

2019-2020 Kansas House of Representatives Committee Assignments
Agriculture and Natural Resources Budget
Local Government
Agriculture

References

Living people
Republican Party Kansas state senators
Republican Party members of the Kansas House of Representatives
21st-century American politicians
21st-century American women politicians
Women state legislators in Kansas
County commissioners in Kansas
People from Barton County, Kansas
1978 births
Kansas State University alumni